The all-seeing eye (or the Eye of Providence) is a symbol that represents the eye of God watching over humanity.

All-seeing eye may also refer to:

 The All Seeing Eye, a 1965 jazz album by Wayne Shorter
 All Seeing I, the British electronic music group
 The All-Seeing Eye, a computer software application for gamers
 All-Seeing Eye (icon), a Russian Orthodox icon
 All-Seeing Eye, a device in the video game The Conduit
 All-Seeing Eyes of the Gods, a pair of fictional artifacts used by Leonardo Watch in the manga series Blood Blockade Battlefront
 Eye of Agamotto, a fictional mystical item appearing American in comic books published by Marvel Comics
 Eye of Sauron, a symbol in J. R. R. Tolkien's The Lord of the Rings

See also
 The Seeing Eye, a guide dog school
 The Seeing Eye (film), a 1951 American short documentary film
 Seeing I, a 1998 novel by Jonathan Blum and Kate Orman